Lookin' Good! is the second and final album led by trumpeter Joe Gordon which was recorded in  1961 and released on the Contemporary label.

Reception

Allmusic awarded the album 4½ stars with its review by Scott Yanow stating: "Although the solos are generally more memorable than the tunes, this is an excellent effort that hints at what might have been had Joe Gordon lived".

Track listing 
All compositions by Joe Gordon
 "Terra Firma Irma" - 7:46
 "A Song for Richard" - 5:05
 "Non-Viennese Waltz Blues" - 4:14
 "You're the Only Girl in the Next World for Me" - 4:05
 "Co-Op Blues" - 6:00
 "Mariana" - 4:13
 "Heleen" - 4:06
 "Diminishing" - 5:07

Personnel 
Joe Gordon - trumpet
Jimmy Woods - alto saxophone
Dick Whittington - piano
Jimmy Bond - bass
Milt Turner - drums

References 

Joe Gordon (musician) albums
1961 albums
Contemporary Records albums